The Angel is a bus service in County Durham and Tyne and Wear, England, which connects Birtley, Low Fell, Gateshead and Newcastle upon Tyne with Chester-le-Street, Durham and Brandon. The service is named after Antony Gormley's Angel of the North, which the route passes.

History
In January 2018, coinciding with 20 years of the Angel of the North, Go North East launched new Wright StreetDeck double-deck vehicles on the route – at a cost of £4.5 million.

In May 2019, additional Friday and Saturday evening and Sunday morning journeys were added. Some journeys were cut during the COVID-19 pandemic, including all-night services.

An all-night service was restored in September 2020 on Friday and Saturday nights, with a daily 24-hour service being introduced in May 2021. It is currently one of three services (including services 56 and 60) operated by Go North East which run to a daily 24-hour service.

From June 2020, the service was altered to additionally serve Arnison Centre.

In September 2021, the service was extended to additionally serve Neville's Cross, Langley Moor and Brandon in County Durham.

Service and operations

The service currently operates up to every 7–10 minutes between Newcastle and Chester-le-Street via Birtley, with services extending to Durham and Brandon  half-hourly. It is currently operated by a fleet of Euro 6 Wright StreetDeck double-deck vehicles, branded in a two-tone green livery, depicting Antony Gormley's Angel of the North.

The service was previously operated by a fleet of Euro 5 hybrid Volvo B5LH/Wright Gemini 2, which were introduced in 2012, and branded in a two-tone green livery similar to that of the current.

Prior to this, the service has been operated by a mixture of single-deck Scania OmniCity and double-deck Volvo B7TL/Wright Gemini vehicles. These were branded in a pink livery, which also depicted the namesake landmark.

References

External links
 
 Go North East website

Bus routes in Tyne and Wear